Bayesian networks are a modeling tool for assigning probabilities to events, and thereby characterizing the uncertainty in a model's predictions. Deep learning and artificial neural networks are approaches used in machine learning to build computational models which learn from training examples. Bayesian neural networks merge these fields. They are a type of artificial neural network whose parameters and predictions are both probabilistic. While standard artificial neural networks often assign high confidence even to incorrect predictions, Bayesian neural networks can more accurately evaluate how likely their predictions are to be correct.

Neural Network Gaussian Processes (NNGPs) are equivalent to Bayesian neural networks in a particular limit, and provide a closed form way to evaluate Bayesian neural networks. They are a Gaussian process probability distribution which describes the distribution over predictions made by the corresponding Bayesian neural network. Computation in artificial neural networks is usually organized into sequential layers of artificial neurons. The number of neurons in a layer is called the layer width. The equivalence between NNGPs and Bayesian neural networks occurs when the layers in a Bayesian neural network become infinitely wide (see figure). This 
large width limit is of practical interest, since finite width neural networks typically perform strictly better as layer width is increased.

The NNGP also appears in several other contexts: it describes the distribution over predictions made by wide non-Bayesian artificial neural networks after random initialization of their parameters, but before training; it appears as a term in neural tangent kernel prediction equations; it is used in deep information propagation to characterize whether hyperparameters and architectures will be trainable. 
It is related to other large width limits of neural networks.

A cartoon illustration 

Every setting of a neural network's parameters  corresponds to a specific function computed by the neural network. A prior distribution  over neural network parameters therefore corresponds to a prior distribution over functions computed by the network. As neural networks are made infinitely wide, this distribution over functions converges to a Gaussian process for many architectures.

The figure to the right plots the one-dimensional outputs  of a neural network for two inputs  and  against each other. This is the distribution in function space corresponding to the distribution  in parameter space, and the black dots are samples from this distribution. For infinitely wide neural networks, since the distribution over functions computed by the neural network is a Gaussian process, the joint distribution over network outputs is a multivariate Gaussian for any finite set of network inputs.

The notation used in this section is the same as the notation used below to derive the correspondence between NNGPs and fully connected networks, and more details can be found there.

Architectures which correspond to an NNGP 
The equivalence between infinitely wide Bayesian neural networks and NNGPs has been shown to hold for: single hidden layer and deep fully connected networks as the number of units per layer is taken to infinity; convolutional neural networks as the number of channels is taken to infinity; transformer networks as the number of attention heads is taken to infinity; recurrent networks as the number of units is taken to infinity.
In fact, this NNGP correspondence holds for almost any architecture: Generally, if an architecture can be expressed solely via matrix multiplication and coordinatewise nonlinearities (i.e. a tensor program), then it has an infinite-width GP.
This in particular includes all feedforward or recurrent neural networks composed of multilayer perceptron, recurrent neural networks (e.g. LSTMs, GRUs), (nD or graph) convolution, pooling, skip connection, attention, batch normalization, and/or layer normalization.

Correspondence between an infinitely wide fully connected network and a Gaussian process 

This section expands on the correspondence between infinitely wide neural networks and Gaussian processes for the specific case of a fully connected architecture. It provides a proof sketch outlining why the correspondence holds, and introduces the specific functional form of the NNGP for fully connected networks. The proof sketch closely follows the approach in Novak, et al., 2018.

Network architecture specification 

Consider a fully connected artificial neural network with inputs , parameters  consisting of weights  and biases  for each layer  in the network, pre-activations (pre-nonlinearity) , activations (post-nonlinearity) , pointwise nonlinearity , and layer widths . For simplicity, the width  of the readout vector  is taken to be 1. The parameters of this network have a prior distribution , which consists of an isotropic Gaussian for each weight and bias, with the variance of the weights scaled inversely with layer width. This network is illustrated in the figure to the right, and described by the following set of equations:

is a Gaussian process 

We first observe that the pre-activations  are described by a Gaussian process conditioned on the preceding activations . This result holds even at finite width. 
Each pre-activation  is a weighted sum of Gaussian random variables, corresponding to the weights  and biases , where the coefficients for each of those Gaussian variables are the preceding activations . 

is a Gaussian process 

The pre-activations  only depend on  through its second moment matrix .

As layer width ,  becomes deterministic 

We have already determined that  is a Gaussian process.

As the layer width  goes to infinity, this average over  samples from the Gaussian process can be replaced with an integral over the Gaussian process:

There are a number of situations where this has been solved analytically, such as when  is a ReLU,
ELU, GELU, or error function nonlinearity.
Even when it can't be solved analytically, since it is a 2d integral it can generally be efficiently computed numerically.
This integral is deterministic, so  is deterministic.

For shorthand, we define a functional , which corresponds to computing this 2d integral for all pairs of inputs, and which maps  into ,

is an NNGP 

where  indicates applying the functional  sequentially  times. 
By combining this expression with the further observations that the input layer second moment matrix  is a deterministic function of the input , and that  is a Gaussian process, the output of the neural network can be expressed as a Gaussian process in terms of its input,

Software libraries 
Neural Tangents is a free and open-source Python library used for computing and doing inference with the NNGP and neural tangent kernel corresponding to various common ANN architectures.

References 

Bayesian networks
Deep learning
Bayesian statistics
Artificial neural networks
Kernel methods for machine learning